Kjer Glacier is a tidewater glacier in the northwestern shore of Greenland. Administratively it belongs to Avannaata municipality.

Geography
It drains the Greenland ice sheet southwestwards into Melville Bay south of the Steenstrup Glacier and north of the Hayes Glacier. The glacier front is located to the northwest of the Tuttulikassak nunatak, with the glacier constituting the northern end of Upernavik Archipelago.

Administrative border 
Before the administrative changes on 1 January 2009 in the country, the border between the former Upernavik Municipality and the former Qaanaaq Municipality ran through Kjer Glacier. After that date both municipalities and the entire coast of Melville Bay were made part of Qaasuitsup municipality. 
Since 1 January 2018 it is part of Avannaata municipality.

See also
List of glaciers in Greenland

References 

Melville Bay
Glaciers of the Upernavik Archipelago

ceb:Kjer Gletscher
sv:Kjer Gletscher